Tirana 7 is one of the 24 administrative units in Tirana.

References

Tirana 07